Francisco Guerau (1649 – 1722) was a Spanish Baroque composer. After being born on Majorca, he entered the singing school at the Royal College in Madrid in 1659, becoming a member of the Royal Chapel as an alto singer and composer ten years later. Named a member of the Royal Chamber of King Charles II of Spain in 1693, he also served as a teacher at the singing school until 1701. His best-known work is a collection of pieces for baroque guitar entitled Poema harmónico that was published in 1694.

References 
Antoni Pizà: Francesc Guerau  i el seu temps (Palma de Mallorca: Govern de les Illes Balears, Conselleria d'Educació i Cultura, Direcció General de Cultura, Institut d'Estudis Baleàrics, 2000)

External links 

Brief biography.
Music in the time of Vélasquez, p. 20.

Spanish Baroque composers
Composers for the classical guitar
1649 births
1722 deaths
Musicians from the Balearic Islands
People from Mallorca
Spanish male classical composers
17th-century classical composers
18th-century classical composers
18th-century male musicians
18th-century musicians
17th-century male musicians